Henry John Adeane (9 June 1833 – 17 February 1870) was a British Liberal and Whig politician.

The son of his namesake Henry John Adeane (MP for Cambridgeshire from 1830 to 1832) and Matilda Abigail née Stanley, Adeane married Lady Elizabeth Philippa Biddulph, daughter of Charles Yorke (also MP for Cambridgeshire between 1832 and 1834) and Susan née Liddell in 1860. They had at least three children: Marie Constance (died 1934); Maud (died 1943); and Charles Robert Whorwood (1863–1943). His daughter, Marie Adeane, was a Maid of Honour to Queen Victoria; she married Sir Bernard Mallet, and they had two sons, one of whom was Sir Victor Mallet, the diplomat.

Adeane followed his father into politics, and was first elected Whig MP for Cambridgeshire at the 1857 general election. Becoming a Liberal in 1859, he held the seat until 1865, when he stood down.

Outside of politics, Adeane was a Major in the Cambridgeshire Militia, a Deputy Lieutenant and a Justice of the Peace.

References

External links
 

Whig (British political party) MPs for English constituencies
Liberal Party (UK) MPs for English constituencies
UK MPs 1857–1859
UK MPs 1859–1865
1833 births
1870 deaths
Deputy Lieutenants in England
English justices of the peace
Henry John 1833